Deli Ji may refer to:
Deli Ji-ye Emamqoli
Deli Ji-ye Gholam
Deli Ji-ye Mandani